Mirsad Sejdić (born 21 August 1953) is a former Bosnian football forward who played in the former Yugoslavia and Turkey.

Career
Born in Jajce, Sejdić started playing football for the youth side of Elektrobosna Jajce. In 1976, he joined Yugoslav First League side FK Borac Banja Luka. After four years with Borac Banja Luka, he moved to NK Olimpija Ljubljana for two seasons.

He transferred to Galatasaray S.K. during the 1981–82 season, playing two seasons with the club in the Süper Lig. He scored twice in the club's 1982–83 European Cup Winners' Cup second round loss to FK Austria Wien. Stints with Süper Lig rivals Bursaspor and Altay S.K. followed.

Sejdić retired from playing football after the 1988–89 season. In 1990, he emigrated to the United States before the outbreak of the Bosnian War.

References

External links
 BiH Timovi u Yu ligi
 EX YU Fudbalska Statistika po godinama
 

1953 births
Living people
Yugoslav footballers
FK Borac Banja Luka players
NK Olimpija Ljubljana (1945–2005) players
Galatasaray S.K. footballers
Bursaspor footballers
Altay S.K. footballers
Süper Lig players
Expatriate footballers in Turkey
Association football forwards